Littoraria flammea was a species of sea snail in the family Littorinidae, the periwinkles or winkles.

This species was endemic to coastal China. It is now extinct.

References

Littorinidae
Extinct gastropods
Extinct animals of China
Fossil taxa described in 1847
Taxonomy articles created by Polbot